Gümüşlü (literally "(place) with silver") is a Turkic name that may refer to:

Places

Azerbaijan
 Gümüşlü, Sharur, a village and municipality in the Sharur District of Nakhchivan Autonomous Republic

Turkey
 Gümüşlü, Besni, a village in the district of Besni, Adıyaman Province
 Gümüşlü, Korkuteli, a village in the district of Korkuteli, Antalya Province
 Gümüşlük, a seaside village and fishing port in the district of Bodrum, Muğla Province

See also
 Gümüş (disambiguation), the Turkish word for "silver"